Ferry Cross the Mersey is the soundtrack for the 1965 film of the same title. Both the UK and US editions feature music by Gerry and the Pacemakers, although other artists featured include the George Martin Orchestra, Cilla Black, the Fourmost, the Black Knights, Earl Royce and the Olympics, and the Blackwells.

It was released on the Columbia label in the UK and United Artists in the US. It contained the singles "It's Gonna Be Alright" (previously released August 1964) and "Ferry Cross the Mersey" (released December 1964 as a teaser for the film).

A CD reissue in a digipak consists of both the mono and stereo versions of the album. The original recording has no backing vocals - just the lone reverberated voice of Gerry Marsden.

Track listing
All tracks composed by Gerry Marsden and performed by Gerry and the Pacemakers, except where indicated.

UK version

US version

Personnel
Gerry and the Pacemakers
Gerry Marsden – guitar, lead vocals
Fred Marsden – drums, backing vocals
Les Maguire – piano, backing vocals
Les "Chad" Chadwick – bass guitar

References

Albums produced by George Martin
Musical film soundtracks
1965 soundtrack albums
EMI Columbia Records soundtracks
Beat music albums